Malaya is a rural locality (a village) in Sylvenskoye Rural Settlement, Permsky District, Perm Krai, Russia. The population was 444 as of 2010. There are 15  streets.

Geography 
Malaya is located 30 km east of Perm (the district's administrative centre) by road. Lyady is the nearest rural locality.

References 

Rural localities in Permsky District